Pollieu is a commune in the Ain department in eastern France.

Population

See also
Communes of the Ain department
Lac de Barterand

References

Communes of Ain
Ain communes articles needing translation from French Wikipedia